Chaudhry and Sons is a 2022 Pakistani romantic family comedy drama television series produced by Abdullah Kadwani and Asad Qureshi under banner 7th Sky Entertainment. It is written by Saima Akram Chaudhry and features Imran Ashraf and Ayeza Khan in leading roles with a supporting cast of Sohail Ahmed, Irsa Ghazal, Madiha Rizvi, Asma Abbas, Yasir Nawaz, Beenish Chohan, Noor ul Hassan and Shagufta Ijaz.

The series aired on Har Pal Geo as Ramadan and Eid al-Fitr special, having daily-basis episodes from 3 April to 5 May 2022.

Cast and characters

Main
 Sohail Ahmed as Chaudhry Dildar Ali Hoshiarpuri:He lives in Lahore and owns a business of transport which he shares with Shakir and Tashi.
 Ayeza Khan as Parisa "Pari" Ahmed: She is Dildar's lost granddaughter (daughter's daughter), who is unable to pass her exams for years. She had owned a couple of lovebirds whom she called "Chanda" and "Tara". Her marriage is arranged with Billu.
 Imran Ashraf as Bilal "Billu" Chaudhry:Dildar's grandson (son's son), he also hasn't obtained his BBA in four years. He loves to rap and is a die-hard fan of Emma Watson whom he claims is also a British-Chaudhry to cover his parents' reaction. His marriage is arranged with Pari.

Recurring
 Irsa Ghazal as Principal Malika Jehan:Pari's paternal grandmother from Hyderabad, Sindh, she has single handedly nurtured Pari and secretly wants her to re-unite with Chaudhry family. She speaks mixed Urdu and English. No one knows their truth except Shakir and Tashi, and they are treated as guests from Hyderabad Deccan instead.
 Noor ul Hassan as Shakir Chaudhry:Billu's father, Shakir is continuously being taunted by his father Dildar over looking even older and not applying black hair dye. Upon discovering the truth about Pari, he consoles her over staying with them and assures of supporting if anything goes against her.
 Asma Abbas as Naima "Nimmo":She is Dildar's niece (brother's daughter) and Billu's mother.
 Yasir Nawaz as Tashfeen "Tashi" Chaudhry:He is Nimmo's un-married brother who still grieves for his ex-fiancée cousin Sabbo.
 Zoya Nasir as Tooba:She is Billu's neighbour and current university fellow, who secretly loves him but could not express it openly.
 Madiha Rizvi as Sheeba "Shabbo":Dildar's niece (sister's daughter) and Bunty's mother, she is ordered by everyone in home to keep working in kitchen, due to which she wants a separate house instead, however, she sometimes laughs during serious discussions. She was a 14 grade officer before her marriage.
 Saqib Sumeer as Dr. Sabir Chaudhry:Shakir's brother and Shabbo's husband, he is a veterinarian and is often taunted for his profession as he had not taken a position in the heirship business.
 Ashraf Khan as Ramazan:He is Tooba's grandfather and Dildar's longtime friend from Gujranwala.
 Beenish Chohan as Mahpara "Paro":Tooba's aunt (mother's sister) and Ramazan's daughter, she secretly loves Tashi but couldn't marry him.
 Humaira Bano as Zulekha
 Hammad Shoaib as Shoaib "Shobi":Billu's best friend, he is after Tooba.
 Raeed Muhammad Alam as Shahrukh:Pari's neighbor in Hyderabad, he stalks her. He visits Lahore for his job and engagement, where he also meets Pari. He unknowingly exposes Pari's truth to the Chaudhry family.
 Sami Khan as Baizad "Bunty" Chaudhry:Shabbo's son, he is also weak in studies and often fights with his fellows. However, his parents want him to study so he wouldn't go into family business and work on his own, like his parents.
 Mehboob Sultan
 Arif Khan
 Shareef Baloch
 Anees Alam

Guest cast
 Shagufta Ejaz as Dr. Salma Hashmi:She is Dildar's secret love interest whom he couldn't marry 35 years back.
 Usman Peerzada as Professor Bakht:Billu's teacher in university, he is Dildar, Ramazan, and Salma's fellow-turned-rival for years.
 Iftikhar Thakur as Mukhtar Chaudhry:Dildar's cousin from Hyderabad Deccan, he also knows Pari's truth as he helps in staging Pari's marriage with Billu as soon as possible due to his illness, however, he passes away.

Production
In January 2022, it was confirmed that Ayeza Khan and Imran Ashraf paired up for Geo Entertainment's Ramadan special television series which is written by Saima Akram Chaudhry. Ayeza Khan's character was first approached to Maya Ali and Sana Javed. Later, it was revealed that Shagufta Ejaz, Asma Abbas, Ashraf Khan, Yasir Nawaz, Beenish Chohan and Sohail Ahmed; latter will be starring in a television series after 8 years since his last series Ullu Baraye Farokht Nahi. DAWN Images reported that the storyline is about a desi family of Lahore's 'Punjabi lifestyle' and their split in Hyderabad, Sindh.

Soundtrack

The soundtrack single "Me Deewana" by Wajhi Farooki was released on 29 March, while its music video on 4 April 2022.

Notes

References

External links
 

2022 Pakistani television series debuts
Ramadan special television shows